Pakur  is a village in Chanditala I community development block of Srirampore subdivision in Hooghly district in the Indian state of West Bengal.

Geography

Gram panchayat
Villages and census towns in Nababpur gram panchayat are: Alipur, Dudhkalmi, Nababpur and Pakur.

Demographics
As per 2011 Census of India Pakur had a total population of 3,997 of which 1,939 (49%) were males and 2,058 (51%) were females. Population below 6 years was 346. The total number of literates in Pakur was 3,161 (86.58% of the population over 6 years).

Culture
Pakur Tarun Sahitya Mandir is a rural library established in 1943.

References

Villages in Chanditala I CD Block